WKTH (88.5 FM) is a K-Love affiliated radio station licensed to the city of Tullahoma, Tennessee. It is owned by Educational Media Foundation. The station broadcasts at 88.5 FM with an effective radiated power output of 1,900 watts as authorized by the Federal Communications Commission.

History
The station began broadcasting in 1998, and held the call sign WAUT. The station was originally owned by the American Family Association and was an affiliate of American Family Radio. On March 1, 2012, the station's call sign was changed to WLYJ. In 2012, American Family Association donated the station to Joy Christian Communications. The station aired a Gospel music format and was flagship station of the Joy Christian Radio network. Effective May 13, 2019, Joy Christian Ministries traded WKTH to Educational Media Foundation, in exchange for 98.9 FM WLYJ in Quitman, Mississippi.

References

External links

Radio stations established in 1998
1998 establishments in Tennessee
Southern Gospel radio stations in the United States
KTH
Educational Media Foundation radio stations
K-Love radio stations